Tanush Dukagjin ( 1423–33), known as Little Tanush, was an Albanian nobleman, a member of the Dukagjini family, the son of Pal Dukagjini (died 1393). He had four brothers: Progon (d. 1394), Pal II (d. 1402), Andrea (d. 1416), and Gjon Dukagjini (d. 1446).

In January 1423, during the Second Scutari War, the Republic of Venice bribed and won over the Pamaliots on Bojana, and then bought over several tribal leader in or near Zeta: the Paštrovići, Gjon Kastrioti (who had extended to the outskirts of Alessio), the Dukagjins, and Koja Zaharija. Though none of these were mobilized militarily by Venice, they left the ranks of Lazarević's army, thus became a potential danger to Lazarević. Although Venetian admiral Francesco Bembo offered money to Gjon Kastrioti, Dukagjins and to Koja Zaharija in April 1423 to join the Venetian forces against Serbian Despotate, they refused.

Supported by the Ottomans, Stefan Maramonte plundered the region around Scutari and Ulcinj, and attacked Drivast in 1429, but failed to capture it. He was accompanied by Gojčin Crnojević and Little Tanush. In April 1429, Tanush received a gift of 120 perpers from the Republic of Ragusa.

Annotations
Name: Tanush Dukagjin, known as Little Tanush or "Tanush Minor".

References

Sources

15th-century Albanian people
Dukagjini family
Medieval Albanian nobility
Year of death unknown
15th-century deaths
Year of birth unknown
15th-century Venetian people
People of the Serbian Despotate
Ottoman vassalage
15th-century soldiers